Leonardo Bravo is one of the 81 municipalities of Guerrero, in south-western Mexico. The municipal seat lies at Chichihualco. The municipality covers an area of 852 km².

In 2005, the municipality had a total population of 22,982.

References

Municipalities of Guerrero